Acrocercops melantherella is a moth of the family Gracillariidae. It is known from Cuba.

The larvae feed on Melanthera aspera and Melanthera deltoidea. They probably mine the leaves of their host plant.

References

melantherella
Moths of the Caribbean
Moths described in 1934
Endemic fauna of Cuba